This list of notable actors from the United Kingdom includes performers in film, radio, stage and television.

Born in 18th century 

 Maria Foote (1797?–1867)
 Henry Gattie (1774–1844)
 Elizabeth Hartley (1750?–1824)
 John Philip Kemble (1757–1823)
 Maria Theresa Kemble (1774–1838) (born in Vienna, Austria)
 Henrietta Amelia Leeson (1751–1826)
 Charles Mathews (1776–1835)
 Mary Wells (1762–1829)

Born in 1800–1829
George John Bennett (1800–1879)
Clara Fisher (1811–1898)
Isabella Glyn (1823–1889)

Born in the 1830s

 Adelaide Calvert (1836–1921)
 Amy Fawsitt (1836–1876)
 Henry Irving (1838–1905)
 John Lawrence Toole (1830–1906)

Born in the 1840s

 Helen Barr (1840–1904)
 Lydia Foote (1843–1892)
 Adelaide Neilson (1847–1880)
 Mary Frances Scott-Siddons (1844–1896)
 Edward O'Connor Terry (1844–1912)
 Ellen Terry (1847–1928)
 Kate Terry (1844–1924)

Born in the 1850s

 Gwynne Herbert (1859–1946)
 Frederick Kerr (1858–1933)
 Jennie Lee (1854–1930)
 Tom Ricketts (1853–1939)
 Marion Terry (1853–1930)

Born in the 1860s

 George Arliss (1868–1946)
 George Bellamy (1866–1944)
 Lionel Belmore (1867–1953)
 Adeline Hayden Coffin (1862–1939) (born in Gräfrath, Germany)
 Brandon Hurst (1866–1947)
 Julia Neilson (1868–1957)
 Olga Nethersole (1867–1951)
 Morton Selten (1860–1939)
 C. Aubrey Smith (1863–1948)
 Fred Terry (1863–1933)
 Henry Vibart (1863–1943)
 May Whitty (1865–1948)

Born in the 1870s

 Marie Ault (1870–1951)
 Constance Collier (1878–1955)
 Nigel De Brulier (1877–1948)
 Edward Gordon Craig (1872–1966)
 Mary Garden (1874–1967)
 Seymour Hicks (1871–1949)
 Halliwell Hobbes (1877–1962)
 Montagu Love (1877–1943)
 Maggie Moffat (1873–1943)
 Roy Redgrave (1873–1922)
 Henry Stephenson (1871–1956)
 Mabel Terry-Lewis (1872–1957)
 Ernest Thesiger (1879–1961)
 Henry Travers (1874–1965)
 H.B. Warner (1876–1958)

Born in the 1880s

 Lionel Atwill (1885–1946)
 Viva Birkett (1887–1934)
 Paul Cavanagh (1888–1964)
 Charlie Chaplin (1889–1977)
 May Clark (1885–1971)
 Gladys Cooper (1888–1971)
 Donald Crisp (1882–1974)
 Edith Evans (1888–1976)
 Lynn Fontanne (1887–1983)
 Will Hay (1888–1949)
 Holmes Herbert (1882–1956)
 Boris Karloff (1887–1969)
 Ralph Lynn (1882–1962)
 Miles Malleson (1888–1969)
 Miles Mander (1888–1946)
 Victor McLaglen (1886–1959) (naturalised American citizen)
 Beryl Mercer (1882–1939)
 Dorothy Minto (1886–1957)
 Una O'Connor (1880–1959) (naturalised American citizen)
 Reginald Owen (1887–1972)
 Nancy Price (1880–1970)
 Claude Rains (1889–1967)
 Elisabeth Risdon (1887–1958)
 Margaret Scudamore (1884–1958)
 Gladys Sylvani (1884–1953)
 Godfrey Tearle (1884–1953)
 Margaret Wycherly (1881–1949)
 George Zucco (1886–1960)

Born in the 1890s

 Leslie Banks (1890–1952)
 Harold Bennett (1899–1981)
 Nigel Bruce (1895–1953)
 Violet Carson (1898-1983)
 Ivy Close (1890–1968)
 Ronald Colman (1891–1958)
 Harry Cording (1891–1954)
 Noël Coward (1899–1973)
 Henry Daniell (1894–1963)
 Reginald Denny (1891–1967)
 Gwen Ffrangcon-Davies (1891–1992)
 Hermione Gingold (1897–1987)
 Cedric Hardwicke (1893–1964)
 Kathleen Harrison (1892–1995)
 Leslie Howard (1893–1943)
 Mervyn Johns (1899–1992)
 Lillian Kemble-Cooper (1892–1977)
 Jack Lambert (1899–1976)
 Charles Laughton (1899–1962)
 Stan Laurel (1890–1965)
 John Laurie (1897–1980)
 Flora Le Breton (1899–1951) 
 Beatrice Lillie (1894–1989) (born in Toronto, Canada)
 Herbert Marshall (1890–1966)
 Alan Mowbray (1896–1969)
 Dennis Neilson-Terry (1895–1932)
 Phyllis Neilson-Terry (1892–1977)
 Cecil Parker (1897–1971)
 Basil Rathbone (1892–1967)
 Kynaston Reeves (1893–1971)
 Margaret Rutherford (1892–1972)
 Olive Sloane (1896–1963)
 Barbara Tennant (1892–1982)
 Arthur Treacher (1894–1975) (naturalised American citizen)
 Norma Varden (1898–1989)

Born in the 1900s

 Alastair Sim  (1900-1976)
 Marguerite Allan (1905–1994) (born in Saint Petersburg, Russia)
 Peggy Ashcroft (1907–1991)
 Arthur Askey (1900–1982)
 Hermione Baddeley (1906–1986)
 Patrick Barr (1908–1985) (born in Akola, India)
 Ballard Berkeley (1904–1988)
 Leslie Bradley (1907–1974)
 Arthur Brough (1905–1978)
 Jane Carr (1909–1957)
 Tom Conway (1904–1967) (born in St. Petersburg, Russia)
 Brenda Dean Paul (1907–1959)
 Robert Donat (1905–1958)
 Leslie Dwyer (1906–1986)
 Errol Flynn (1909–1959) (born in Tasmania and later naturalised American citizen)
 Valentine Dyall (1908–1985)
 Leslie French (1904–1999)
 Greer Garson (1904–1996) (naturalised American citizen)
 Leo Genn (1905–1978)
 John Gielgud (1904–2000)
 Cary Grant (1904–1986) (naturalised American citizen)
 Rex Harrison (1908–1990)
 William Hartnell (1908–1975)
 Bob Hope (1903–2003) (naturalised American citizen)
 Benita Hume (1906–1967)
 Wilfrid Hyde-White (1903–1991) 
 Freda Jackson (1907–1990)
 Celia Johnson (1908–1982)
 Griffith Jones (1909–2007)
 Moultrie Kelsall (1904–1980)
 Esmond Knight (1906–1987)
 Bernard Lee (1908–1981)
 Queenie Leonard (1905–2002)
 Roger Livesey (1906–1976)
 Charles Lloyd-Pack (1902–1983)
 James Mason (1909–1984)
 Guy Middleton (1907–1973)
 Anna Neagle (1904–1986)
 Robert Newton (1905–1956)
 Anthony Nicholls (1902–1977)
 Mary Odette (1901–1987) (born in Dieppe, France)
 Laurence Olivier (1907–1989)
 J. Pat O'Malley (1904–1985)
 Michael Redgrave (1908–1985)
 Trevor Reid (1908–1965)
 Michael Rennie (1909–1971) (naturalised American citizen)
 Ralph Richardson (1902–1983)
 John Robinson (1908–1979)
 Flora Robson (1902–1984)
 George Sanders (1906–1972) (born in Saint Petersburg, Russia)
 Sebastian Shaw (1905–1994)
 Francis L. Sullivan (1903–1956)
 Nora Swinburne (1902–2000)
 Jessica Tandy (1909–1994) (naturalised American citizen)
 Ralph Truman (1900–1977)
 Ronald Ward (1901–1978)
 Naunton Wayne (1901–1970)
 Alan Webb (1906–1982)
 Diana Wynyard (1906–1964)

Born in the 1910s 

 Alfie Bass (1916–1987)
 Martin Benson (1918–2010)
 Pamela Brown (1917–1975)
 Eric Christmas (1916–2000)
 Bryan Coleman (1911–2005)
 Peter Copley (1915–2008)
 Cyril Cusack (1910–1993)
 Peter Cushing (1913–1994)
 Anthony Dawson (1916–1992)
 Arthur English (1919–1995)
 Peter Finch (1916–1977)
 Joan Fontaine (1917–2013) (naturalised American citizen; born in Tokyo, Japan)
 Michael Goodliffe (1914–1976)
 Harold Goodwin (1917–2004)
 Marius Goring (1912–1998)
 Michael Gough (1916–2011) (born in Kuala Lumpur, Malaysia)
 Dulcie Gray (1915–2011)
 John Gregson (1919–1975)
 Joyce Grenfell (1910–1979)
 Lucy Griffiths (1919–1982)
 Alec Guinness (1914–2000)
 Olivia de Havilland (1916–2020) (naturalised American citizen; born in Tokyo, Japan)
 Jack Hawkins (1910–1973)
 Wendy Hiller (1912–2003)
 Michael Hordern (1911–1995)
 Trevor Howard (1913–1988)
 Richard Hurndall (1910–1984)
 Sid James (1913–1976)
 Margo Johns (1919–2009)
 Geoffrey Keen (1916–2005)
 Rachel Kempson (1910–2003)
 Sam Kydd (1915–1982)
 Vivien Leigh (1913–1967) (born in Darjeeling, India)
 Desmond Llewelyn (1914–1999)
 Margaret Lockwood (1916–1990)
 Arthur Lowe (1915–1982)
 Kenneth More (1914–1982)
 David Niven (1910–1983)
 Merle Oberon (1911–1979) (born in Mumbai, India)
 Nigel Patrick (1912–1981)
 Jon Pertwee (1919–1996)
 Donald Pleasence (1919–1995)
 Dennis Price (1915–1973)
 Anthony Quayle (1913–1989)
 Luise Rainer (1910–2014) (born in Düsseldorf, Germany)
 Joyce Redman (1918–2012)
 Michael Ripper (1913–2000)
 Paul Rogers (1917–2013)
 June Spencer (born 1919) 
 Sydney Tafler (1916–1979)
 Richard Todd (1919–2009)
 Terry-Thomas (1911–1990)
 David Tomlinson (1917–2000)
 Richard Wattis (1912–1975)
 Norman Wisdom (1915–2010)
 Googie Withers (1917–2011)

Born in the 1920s

 Joss Ackland (born 1928)
 Robert Arden (1922–2004) (naturalised American citizen)
 Richard Attenborough (1923–2014)
 Jill Balcon (1925–2009)
 Ronnie Barker (1929–2005)
 Geoffrey Bayldon (1924–2017)
 Thane Bettany (1929–2015) (born in Sarawak)
 Honor Blackman (1925–2020)
 Dirk Bogarde (1921–1999)
 Lyndon Brook (1926–2004)
 Robert Brown (1921–2003)
 Tony Britton (1924–2019)
 Dora Bryan (1923–2014)
 Peter Burton (1921–1989)
 Richard Burton (1925–1984)
 Tom Chatto (1920–1982)
 George Cole (1925–2015)
 Bonar Colleano (1924–1958)
 Bernard Cribbins (1928–2022)
 Peggy Cummins (1925–2017)
 Paul Danquah (1925–2015)
 Nigel Davenport (1928–2013)
 Jeffery Dench (1928–2014)
 Edna Doré (1921–2014)
 Roy Dotrice (1923–2017)
 Mark Eden (1928–2021)
 Fenella Fielding (1927–2018)
 Frank Finlay (1926–2016)
 Gerald Flood (1927–1989)
 Bernard Fox (1927–2016)
 William Franklyn (1925–2006)
 Charles Gray (1928–2000)
 Nigel Green (1924–1972) (born in Pretoria, South Africa)
 Joan Greenwood (1921–1987)
 Robert Hardy (1925–2017)
 Rosemary Harris (born 1927) (naturalised American citizen)
 Nigel Hawthorne (1929–2001)
 Jack Hedley (1929–2021)
 Audrey Hepburn (1929–1993) (born in Ixelles, Belgium)
 Barbara Hicks (1924–2013)
 Jacqueline Hill (1929–1993)
 Donald Houston (1923–1991)
 Glyn Houston (1925–2019)
 Colin Jeavons (born 1929)
 Lionel Jeffries (1926–2010)
 Margaret John (1926–2011)
 Glynis Johns (born 1923) (Born in South Africa)
 Miriam Karlin (1925–2011)
 Maurice Kaufmann (1927–1997)
 Deborah Kerr (1921–2007)
 Danny La Rue (1927–2009)
 Cleo Laine (born 1927)
 Harry Landis (1926–2022)
 Angela Lansbury (1925–2022) (naturalised American citizen)
 Peter Lawford (1923–1984)
 Christopher Lee (1922–2015)
 Ronald Leigh-Hunt (1920–2005)
 Margaret Leighton (1922–1976)
 David Lodge (1921–2003)
 Joan Lorring (1926–2014)
 Victor Maddern (1928–1993)
 Ron Moody (1924–2015)
 Roger Moore (1927–2017)
 John Neville (1925–2011)
 Geoffrey Palmer (1927–2020)
 Conrad Phillips (1925–2016)
 Leslie Phillips (1924–2022)
 Joan Plowright (born 1929)
 Eric Porter (1928–1995)
 Robert Rietti (1923–2015)
 Brian Rix (1924–2016)
 Rachel Roberts (1927–1980) (dual British and American citizenship)
 George Rose (1920–1988)
 Norman Rossington (1928–1999)
 Leonard Rossiter (1926–1984)
 Patricia Routledge (born 1929)
 William Russell (born 1924)
 Peter Sallis (1921–2017)
 Paul Scofield (1922–2008)
 Peter Sellers (1925–1980)
 Susan Shaw (1929–1978)
 Dinah Sheridan (1920–2012)
 Sheila Sim (1922–2016)
 Jean Simmons (1929–2010)
 Donald Sinden (1923–2014)
 Elizabeth Spriggs (1929–2008)
 Anthony Steel (1920–2001)
 Mollie Sugden (1922–2009)
 Eric Sykes (1923–2012)
 Frank Thornton (1921–2013)
 Bill Travers (1922–1994)
 Patrick Troughton (1920–1987)
 Peter Ustinov (1921–2004)
 Jack Watling (1923–2001)
 Moray Watson (1928–2017)
 June Whitfield (1925–2018)
 Kenneth Williams (1926–1988)
 Peter Wyngarde (1927–2018) (born in Marseille, France)

Born in the 1930s

A–M

 Anthony Ainley (1932–2004)
 Julie Andrews (born 1935)
 Eileen Atkins (born 1934)
 Kenny Baker (1934–2016)
 Tom Baker (born 1934)
 Trevor Bannister (1934–2011)
 Alan Bates (1934–2003)
 David Battley (1935–2003)
 Kathryn Beaumont (born 1938)
 Brian Bedford (1935–2016) (naturalised American citizen)
 Rodney Bewes (1937–2017)
 Colin Blakely (1930–1987)
 Brian Blessed (born 1936)
 Claire Bloom (born 1931)
 James Bolam (born 1935)
 Bette Bourne (born 1939)
 Roy Boyd (born 1938)
 Stephen Boyd (1931–1977)
 Jeremy Brett (1933–1995)
 Roger Brierley (1935–2005)
 Richard Briers (1934–2013)
 Eleanor Bron (born 1938)
 David Burke (born 1934)
 Mark Burns (1936–2007)
 Patsy Byrne (1933–2014)
 Michael Caine (born 1933)
 John Cater (1932–2009)
 Tony Church (1930–2008)
 John Cleese (born 1939)
 Joan Collins (born 1933)
 Paul Collins (born 1937)
 Neil Connery (1938–2021)
 Sean Connery (1930–2020)
 Peter Cook (1937–1995)
 Nicolas Coster (born 1933)
 Tom Courtenay (born 1937)
 Wendy Craig (born 1934)
 Anna Cropper (1938–2007)
 Annette Crosbie (born 1934)
 Frances Cuka (1936–2020)
 Roland Curram (born 1932)
 Jim Dale (born 1935)
 Ann Davies (1934–2022)
 Richard Dawson (1932–2012) (naturalised American citizen)
 Judi Dench (born 1934)
 Eileen Derbyshire (born 1931)
 Diana Dors (1931–1984)
 Shirley Eaton (born 1937)
 Samantha Eggar (born 1939)
 Shirley Anne Field (born 1938)
 Albert Finney (1936–2019)
 Barry Foster (1931–2002)
 Edward Fox (born 1937)
 James Fox (born 1939)
 Jill Gascoine (1937–2020)
 Peter Gilmore (1931–2013) (born in Leipzig, Germany)
 Julian Glover (born 1935)
 Susan Hampshire (born 1937)
 Sheila Hancock (born 1933)
 Edward Hardwicke (1932–2011)
 Noel Harrison (1934–2013)
 Malcolm Hebden (born 1939)
 Anne Heywood (born 1931)
 Ian Holm (1931–2020)
 Anthony Hopkins (born 1937) (naturalised American citizen)
 Sally Ann Howes (1930–2021)
 John Inman (1935–2007)
 Jill Ireland (1936–1990)
 Glenda Jackson (born 1936)
 Derek Jacobi (born 1938)
 Michael Jayston (born 1935)
 Barbara Jefford (1930–2020)
 Barbara Knox (born 1933)
 Phyllida Law (born 1932)
 Rosemary Leach (1935–2017)
 Ann Lynn (1933–2020)
 Anna Massey (1937–2011)
 Jamila Massey (born 1934) (born in British India)
 David McCallum (born 1933) (naturalised American citizen)
 Geraldine McEwan (1932–2015)
 Ian McKellen (born 1939)
 Ann Mitchell (born 1939)
 Dudley Moore (1935–2002)
 Patrick Mower (born 1938)

N–Z

 Anthony Newley (1931–1999)
 Nanette Newman (born 1934)
 Simon Oates (1932–2009)
 Peter O'Toole (1932–2013)
 Judy Parfitt (born 1935)
 Dorothy Paul (born 1937)
 Siân Phillips (born 1933)
 Christina Pickles (born 1935)
 Vivian Pickles (born 1931)
 Ingrid Pitt (1937–2010)
 Mike Pratt (1931–1976)
 David Prowse (1935–2020)
 Peter Purves (born 1939)
 Anna Quayle (1932–2019)
 Corin Redgrave (1939–2010)
 Vanessa Redgrave (born 1937)
 Oliver Reed (1938–1999)
 Anne Reid (born 1935)
 Ian Richardson (1934–2007)
 Diana Rigg (1938–2020)
 William Roache (born 1932)
 Patsy Rowlands (1931–2005)
 David Ryall (1935–2014)
 Prunella Scales (born 1932)
 Barbara Shelley (1932–2021)
 Carole Shelley (1939–2018)
 Joan Sims (1930–2001)
 Roy Skelton (1931–2011)
 Maggie Smith (born 1934)
 Nicholas Smith (1934–2015)
 Anne Stallybrass (1938–2021)
 Terence Stamp (born 1938)
 John Stride (1936–2018)
 Una Stubbs (1937–2021)
 Janet Suzman (born 1939)
 Clive Swift (1936–2019)
 Sylvia Syms (1934–2023)
 Elizabeth Taylor (1932–2011) (dual citizenship; born to American parents living in England)
 Josephine Tewson (1931–2022)
 Angela Thorne (born 1939)
 Ricky Tomlinson (born 1939)
 Bridget Turner (1939–2014)
 Margaret Tyzack (1931–2011)
 Anthony Valentine (1939–2015)
 James Villiers (1933–1998)
 Shani Wallis (born 1933) (naturalised American citizen)
 Jan Waters (born 1937)
 Anita West (born 1935)
 Timothy West (born 1934)
 Paxton Whitehead (born 1937)
 Billie Whitelaw (1932–2014)
 Michael Williams (1935–2001)
 Richard Wilson (born 1936)
 Barbara Windsor (1937–2020)
 Edward Woodward (1930–2009)
 Gabriel Woolf  (born 1932)
 Dana Wynter (1931–2011) (born in Berlin, Germany)
 Susannah York (1939–2011)

Born in the 1940s

A–M

 Maria Aitken (born 1945)
 John Alderton (born 1940)
 Anthony Andrews (born 1948)
 Francesca Annis (born 1945)
 Alun Armstrong (born 1946)
 Sean Arnold (1941–2020)
 Jane Asher (born 1946)
 Colin Baker (born 1943)
 Stephanie Beacham (born 1947)
 Richard Beckinsale (1947–1979)
 Geoffrey Beevers (born 1941)
 Mike Berry (born 1942)
 Martine Beswick (born 1941) (born in Port Antonio, Jamaica)
 Jane Birkin (born 1946)
 Jacqueline Bisset (born 1944)
 Cilla Black (1943–2015)
 Brenda Blethyn (born 1946)
 David Bowie (1947–2016)
 Jim Broadbent (born 1949)
 Paul Brooke (born 1944)
 Jeremy Bulloch (1945–2020)
 Peter Burroughs (born 1947)
 David Calder (born 1946)
 Simon Callow (born 1949)
 Ken Campbell (1941–2011)
 Jim Carter (born 1948)
 Anna Carteret (born 1942) (born in Bangalore, India)
 Christopher Cazenove (1943–2010)
 Julian Chagrin (born 1940)
 John Challis (1942–2021)
 Geraldine Chaplin (born 1944) (born in Santa Monica, California, United States)
 Graham Chapman (1941–1989)
 Ian Charleson (1949–1990)
 Julie Christie (born 1940) (born in Chabua, India)
 Warren Clarke (1947–2014)
 Stephanie Cole (born 1941)
 David Collings (1940–2020)
 Lewis Collins (1946–2013)
 Pauline Collins (born 1940)
 Billy Connolly (born 1942)
 Tom Conti (born 1941)
 Ron Cook (born 1948)
 Charlotte Cornwell (1949–2021)
 Judy Cornwell (born 1940)
 Brian Cox (born 1946)
 Kenneth Cranham (born 1944)
 Michael Crawford (born 1942)
 Ben Cross (1947–2020)
 Tim Curry (born 1946)
 Timothy Dalton (born 1946)
 Charles Dance (born 1946)
 Anthony Daniels (born 1946)
 Michele Dotrice (born 1948)
 Richard Durden (born 1944)
 Marianne Faithfull (born 1946)
 Sally Faulkner (born 1944)
 Pam Ferris (born 1948) (born in Hanover, West Germany)
 Barbara Flynn (born 1948)
 Carole Ann Ford (born 1940)
 Clive Francis (born 1946)
 Jan Francis (born 1947)
 Michael Gambon (born 1940)
 Dana Gillespie (born 1949)
 Sheila Gish (1942–2005)
 Derek Griffiths (born 1946)
 Richard Griffiths (1947–2013)
 Georgina Hale (born 1943)
 Richard Heffer (born 1946)
 Nicky Henson (1945–2019)
 Bernard Hill (born 1944)
 Frazer Hines (born 1944)
 Patricia Hodge (born 1946)
 Julian Holloway (born 1944)
 Bob Hoskins (1942–2014)
 Geoffrey Hughes (1944–2012)
 Nerys Hughes (born 1941)
 Gareth Hunt (1942–2007)
 John Hurt (1940–2017)
 Judy Huxtable (born 1942)
 Jonathan Hyde (born 1948)
 Eric Idle (born 1943)
 Jeremy Irons (born 1948)
 Susan Jameson (born 1941)
 David Jason (born 1940)
 Paul Jesson (born 1946)
 Caroline John (1940–2012)
 Gemma Jones (born 1942)
 Terry Jones (1942–2020)
 Penelope Keith (born 1940)
 Sam Kelly (1943–2014)
 Felicity Kendal (born 1946)
 Cheryl Kennedy (born 1947)
 Ben Kingsley (born 1943)
 Michael Kitchen (born 1948)
 Jane Lapotaire (born 1944)
 Rula Lenska (born 1947)
 Valerie Leon (born 1943)
 Maureen Lipman (born 1946)
 Roger Lloyd-Pack (1944–2014)
 Judy Loe (born 1947)
 Joanna Lumley (born 1946) (born in Srinagar, India)
 Katy Manning (born 1946)
 Judy Matheson (born 1945)
 Sylvester McCoy (born 1943)
 Malcolm McDowell (born 1943) (naturalised American citizen)
 Sarah Miles (born 1941)
 Brian Miller (born 1941)
 Hayley Mills (born 1946)
 Juliet Mills (born 1941) (naturalised American citizen) 
 Helen Mirren (born 1945)
 Angela Morant (born 1941)
 Caroline Munro (born 1949)

N–Z

 Olivia Newton-John (1948–2022)
 Bill Nighy (born 1949)
 Maureen O'Brien (born 1943)
 Ian Ogilvy (born 1943)
 Elaine Paige (born 1948)
 Michael Palin (born 1943)
 Bill Paterson (born 1945)
 Jacqueline Pearce (1943–2018)
 Susan Penhaligon (born 1949)
 Joanna Pettet (born 1942)
 Ronald Pickup (1940–2021)
 Tim Pigott-Smith (1946–2017)
 Angela Pleasence (born 1941)
 Adrienne Posta (born 1949)
 Pete Postlethwaite (1946–2011)
 Robert Powell (born 1944)
 Jonathan Pryce (born 1947)
 Diana Quick (born 1946)
 Charlotte Rampling (born 1946)
 Lynn Redgrave (1943–2010)
 Angharad Rees (1944–2012)
 Roger Rees (1944–2015) (naturalised American citizen)
 John Rhys-Davies (born 1944)
 Wendy Richard (1943–2009)
 Alan Rickman (1946–2016)
 Roshan Seth (born 1942)
 Elisabeth Sladen (1946–2011)
 David Soul (born 1943) (naturalised British citizen)
 Ringo Starr (born 1940)
 Alison Steadman (born 1946)
 Patrick Stewart (born 1940)
 David Suchet (born 1946)
 Nigel Terry (1945–2015)
 Frances de la Tour (born 1944)
 Rita Tushingham (born 1942)
 Twiggy (born 1949)
 Nick Ullett (born 1941) (naturalised American citizen)
 Zoë Wanamaker (born 1949) (born in New York City; naturalised American citizen)
 David Warbeck (1941–1997)
 David Warner (1941–2022)
 Dennis Waterman (1948–2022)
 Deborah Watling (1948–2017)
 Dilys Watling (1943–2021)
 Sheila White (1948–2018)
 Tom Wilkinson (born 1948)
 Anneke Wills (born 1941)
 Hamish Wilson (1942–2020)
 Penelope Wilton (born 1946)
 Tessa Wyatt (born 1948)
 Michael York (born 1942)

Born in the 1950s

A–M

 Jenny Agutter (born 1952)
 Roger Allam (born 1953)
 Keith Allen (born 1953)
 Kevin Allen (born 1959)
 Debbie Arnold (born 1955)
 Rowan Atkinson (born 1955)
 Imogen Bain (1959–2014)
 Paul Barber (born 1951)
 Michael Barrymore (born 1952)
 Robert Bathurst (born 1957)
 Sean Bean (born 1959)
 Tim Bentinck (born 1953)
 Philip Bretherton (born 1955)
 Moira Brooker (born 1957)
 Pierce Brosnan (born 1953) (born in Drogheda, County Louth Ireland) (naturalised American citizen)
 Ralph Brown (born 1957)
 Suzanne Burden (born 1958)
 Kate Burton (born 1957) (born in Geneva, Switzerland; has British and American citizenship)
 Peter Capaldi (born 1958)
 Jane Carr (born 1950)
 Kim Cattrall (born 1956) (Anglo-Canadian-American) 
 Maxwell Caulfield (born 1959) (naturalised American citizen)
 Simon Chandler (born 1953)
 Daniel Chatto (born 1957)
 Julie Dawn Cole (born 1957)
 Robbie Coltrane (1950–2022)
 Gerry Cowper (born 1958)
 Peter Davison (born 1951)
 Daniel Day-Lewis (born 1957)
 Reece Dinsdale (born 1959)
 Karen Dotrice (born 1955)
 Sarah Douglas (born 1952)
 Lesley-Anne Down (born 1954) (naturalised American citizen)
 Lindsay Duncan (born 1950)
 Sheena Easton (born 1959) (naturalised American citizen)
 Kevin Eldon (born 1959)
 Trevor Eve (born 1951)
 Rupert Everett (born 1959)
 Peter Firth (born 1953)
 Marsha Fitzalan (born 1953) (born in Bonn, West Germany)
 Frances Fisher (born 1952) (naturalised American citizen)
 Pamela Franklin (born 1950) (born in Yokohama, Japan)
 Sabina Franklyn (born 1954)
 Lynne Frederick (1954–1994)
 Dawn French (born 1957)
 Stephen Fry (born 1957)
 Fiona Fullerton (born 1956) (born in Nigeria)
 Susan George (born 1950)
 Caroline Goodall (born 1959)
 Candace Glendenning (born 1953) 
 Richard E. Grant (born 1957) (born in Mbabane, Swaziland)
 Cathryn Harrison (1959–2018)
 Nigel Havers (born 1951)
 Anthony Head (born 1954)
 Lenny Henry (born 1958)
 Sherrie Hewson (born 1950)
 Ciarán Hinds (born 1953)
 Jane How (born 1950)
 Finola Hughes (born 1959)
 Olivia Hussey (born 1951)
 Alex Hyde-White (born 1959) (naturalised American citizen) 
 Celia Imrie (born 1952)
 Geraldine James (born 1950)
 Louise Jameson (born 1951)
 David Janson (born 1950)
 Gerard Kelly (1959–2010)
 Gary Kemp (born 1959)
 Alice Krige (born 1954) (born in Upington, South Africa)
 Hugh Laurie (born 1959)
 Josie Lawrence (born 1959)
 Helen Lederer (born 1954)
 Sylvestra Le Touzel (born 1958)
 Delroy Lindo (born 1952) (British-American)
 Robert Llewellyn (born 1956)
 Phyllis Logan (born 1956)
 Cherie Lunghi (born 1952)
 Rik Mayall (1958–2014)
 Joe McGann (born 1958)
 Paul McGann (born 1959)
 Alfred Molina (born 1953) (naturalised American citizen)
 Fiona Mollison (born 1954)
 Peter Mullan (born 1959)

N–Z

 Liam Neeson (born 1952) (naturalised American citizen)
 Vincenzo Nicoli (born 1958)
 Gary Oldman (born 1958)
 Helen Pearson (born 1959)
 Julie Peasgood (born 1956)
 Pauline Quirke (born 1959)
 Adrian Rawlins (born 1958)
 Amanda Redman (born 1957)
 Miranda Richardson (born 1958)
 Laurance Rudic (born 1952)
 Patrick Ryecart (born 1952)
 Jennifer Saunders (born 1958)
 David Schofield (born 1951)
 Jenny Seagrove (born 1957) (born in Malaya)
 Nabil Shaban (born 1953) (born in Amman, Jordan)
 Jane Seymour (born 1951) (naturalised American citizen)
 Ruth Sheen (born 1952)
 Jeremy Sinden (1950–1996)
 Marc Sinden (born 1954)
 Marina Sirtis (born 1955) (naturalised American citizen)
 Tony Slattery (born 1959)
 Timothy Spall (born 1957)
 Imelda Staunton (born 1956)
 Juliet Stevenson (born 1956)
 Mark Strickson (born 1959)
 Trudie Styler (born 1954)
 Mary Tamm (1950–2012)
 Emma Thompson (born 1959)
 Harriet Thorpe (born 1957)
 Tracey Ullman (born 1959) (naturalised American citizen)
 Julian Wadham (born 1958)
 Harriet Walter (born 1950)
 Julie Walters (born 1950)
 Lalla Ward (born 1951)
 Giles Watling (born 1953)
 Kevin Whately (born 1951)
 Peter Wight (born 1950)
 Jack Wild (1952–2006)
 Mark Williams (born 1959)
 Ray Winstone (born 1957)
 Victoria Wood (1953–2016)
 Susan Wooldridge (born 1950)
 David Yip (born 1951)

Born in the 1960s

A–M

 Mark Addy (born 1964)
 Caroline Aherne (1963–2016)
 Holly Aird (born 1969)
 Adewale Akinnuoye-Agbaje (born 1967)
 Sophie Aldred (born 1962)
 Gillian Anderson (born 1968) (American-British; born in Chicago, Illinois, United States)
 Adjoa Andoh (born 1963)
 Naveen Andrews (born 1969) (naturalised American citizen)
 Lysette Anthony (born 1963)
 Lorraine Ashbourne (born 1961)
 Bill Bailey (born 1965)
 Matt Bardock (born 1969)
 Chris Barrie (born 1960)
 John Barrowman (born 1967) (dual British and American citizenship)
 Simon Russell Beale (born 1961) (born in Penang, Malaysia)
 Samantha Beckinsale (born 1966)
 Gina Bellman (born 1966) (born in Auckland, New Zealand)
 Nick Berry (born 1963)
 Caroline Bliss (born 1961)
 Samantha Bond (born 1961)
 Helena Bonham Carter (born 1966)
 Hugh Bonneville (born 1963)
 Kenneth Branagh (born 1960)
 Lucy Briers (born 1967)
 Kathy Burke (born 1964)
 Gerard Butler (born 1969)
 Robert Carlyle (born 1961)
 Raquel Cassidy (born 1968)
 Caroline Catz (born 1969)
 Anna Chancellor (born 1965)
 Ben Chaplin (born 1969)
 Craig Charles (born 1964)
 Maggie Cheung (born 1964) (born in British Hong Kong)
 Tracey Childs (born 1963)
 Flaminia Cinque (born 1964)
 Lucy Cohu (born 1968)
 Jason Connery (born 1963)
 Steve Coogan (born 1965)
 Daniel Craig (born 1968)
 Greg Cruttwell (born 1960)
 Alan Cumming (born 1965) (naturalised American citizen)
 Henry Ian Cusick (born 1967) (born in Peru)
 Alan Davies (born 1966)
 Hugh Dennis (born 1962)
 Amanda Donohoe (born 1962)
 Blythe Duff (born 1962)
 Jason Durr (born 1967) (born in Singapore)
 Christopher Eccleston (born 1964)
 Cary Elwes (born 1962)
 Michelle Fairley (born 1963)
 Craig Ferguson (born 1962) (naturalised American citizen)
 Ralph Fiennes (born 1962)
 Siobhan Finneran (born 1966)
 Colin Firth (born 1960)
 Tommy Flanagan (born 1965)
 Jason Flemyng (born 1966)
 Dexter Fletcher (born 1966)
 Michael French (born 1962)
 Maria Friedman (born 1960) (born in Switzerland)
 Sadie Frost (born 1965)
 Jenny Funnell (born 1963)
 Mark Gatiss (born 1966)
 Ruth Gemmell (born 1967)
 Ricky Gervais (born 1961)
 Lou Gish (1967–2006)
 Philip Glenister (born 1963)
 Robert Glenister (born 1960)
 Adam Godley (born 1964)
 Michelle Gomez (born 1966)
 Tom Goodman-Hill (born 1968)
 Julie Graham (born 1965)
 Hugh Grant (born 1960)
 Rupert Graves (born 1963)
 Robson Green (born 1964)
 Tamsin Greig (born 1966)
 John Hannah (born 1962)
 Caroline Harker (born 1966)
 Susannah Harker (born 1965)
 Jared Harris (born 1961)
 Sean Harris (born 1966)
 Ian Hart (born 1964)
 Tamer Hassan (born 1968)
 Greg Hemphill (born 1969)
 Shirley Henderson (born 1965)
 Ruthie Henshall (born 1967)
 Tom Hollander (born 1967)
 Jane Horrocks (born 1964)
 Steve Huison (born 1962)
 Elizabeth Hurley (born 1965)
 Llŷr Ifans (born 1968)
 Rhys Ifans (born 1967)
 Jason Isaacs (born 1963)
 Kate Isitt (born 1965)
 Marianne Jean-Baptiste (born 1967)
 Danny John-Jules (born 1960)
 Toby Jones (born 1966)
 Vinnie Jones (born 1965)
 Hakeem Kae-Kazim (born 1962) (born in Lagos, Nigeria)
 Martin Kemp (born 1961)
 Patsy Kensit (born 1968)
 Ford Kiernan (born 1962)
 Claire King (born 1963)
 Alex Kingston (born 1963)
 Jo-Anne Knowles (born 1969)
 Bonnie Langford (born 1964)
 Chris Larkin (born 1967)
 Jane Leeves (born 1961)
 Dave Legeno (1963–2014)
 Adrian Lester (born 1968)
 Natasha Little (born 1969)
 Richard Lumsden (born 1965)
 Nicholas Lyndhurst (born 1961)
 Eddie Marsan (born 1968)
 Helen McCrory (1968–2021)
 Sandy McDade (born 1964)
 Colin McFarlane (born 1961)
 Mark McGann (born 1961)
 Stephen McGann (born 1963)
 Ben Miles (born 1967)
 Ben Miller (born 1966)
 Poppy Miller (born 1969)
 Julianne Moore (born 1960) (naturalised British citizen)
 David Morrissey (born 1964)
 Neil Morrissey (born 1962)
 Stephen Moyer (born 1969)

N–Z

 James Nesbitt (born 1965)
 Hermione Norris (born 1967)
 Jeremy Northam (born 1961)
 David O'Hara (born 1965)
 Tracy-Ann Oberman (born 1966)
 Sophie Okonedo (born 1968)
 Julia Ormond (born 1965)
 Clive Owen (born 1964)
 Lisa Palfrey (born 1967)
 Sarah Parish (born 1968)
 Nathaniel Parker (born 1962)
 Sean Pertwee (born 1964)
 James Purefoy (born 1964)
 Caroline Quentin (born 1960)
 Jemma Redgrave (born 1965)
 Saskia Reeves (born 1961)
 Joely Richardson (born 1965)
 Natasha Richardson (1963–2009)
 Fay Ripley (born 1966)
 Linus Roache (born 1964)
 Tim Roth (born 1961)
 Catherine Russell (born 1966)
 Daniel Ryan (born 1968)
 Mark Rylance (born 1960)
 Rebecca Saire (born 1963)
 Colin Salmon (born 1961)
 Emma Samms (born 1960)
 Julia Sawalha (born 1968)
 Joanna Scanlan (born 1961)
 Adrian Scarborough (born 1968)
 Dougray Scott (born 1965)
 Kristin Scott Thomas (born 1960)
 Andy Serkis (born 1964)
 Rufus Sewell (born 1967)
 Josette Simon (born 1960)
 Michael Sheen (born 1969)
 Mark Sheppard (born 1964)
 Nicollette Sheridan (born 1963) (naturalised American citizen)
 Alexander Siddig (born 1965) (born in Wad Madani, Sudan)
 Nina Sosanya (born 1969)
 Hugo Speer (born 1969)
 Samantha Spiro (born 1968)
 Jason Statham (born 1967)
 Toby Stephens (born 1969)
 Ray Stevenson (born 1964)
 Mark Strong (born 1963)
 Imogen Stubbs (born 1961)
 Sarah Sutton (born 1961)
 Peter Sullivan (born 1964)
 Tilda Swinton (born 1960)
 Catherine Tate (born 1968)
 David Thewlis (born 1963)
 Sophie Thompson (born 1962)
 Stephen Tompkinson (born 1965)
 Cathy Tyson (born 1965)
 Eamonn Walker (born 1962)
 Polly Walker (born 1966)
 Julie T. Wallace (born 1961)
 Bradley Walsh (born 1960)
 Marc Warren (born 1967)
 Emily Watson (born 1967)
 Naomi Watts (born 1968)
 Dominic West (born 1969)
 Joanne Whalley (born 1964)
 Lia Williams (born 1964)
 Olivia Williams (born 1968)
 Peter Wingfield (born 1962)
 Emily Woof (born 1967)
 Angus Wright (born 1964)
 Catherine Zeta-Jones (born 1969)

Born in the 1970s

A–M

 Amanda Abbington (born 1974)
 Christine Adams (born 1974)
 Freema Agyeman (born 1979)
 Sarah Alexander (born 1971)
 Nikki Amuka-Bird (born 1976)
 Chloë Annett (born 1971)
 Gabrielle Anwar (born 1970) (naturalised American citizen)
 Lucy Akhurst (born 1970)
 Richard Armitage (born 1971)
 Alexander Armstrong (born 1970)
 Joe Armstrong (born 1978)
 Kate Ashfield (born 1972)
 Richard Ayoade (born 1977)
 Kate Baines (born 1978)
 Christian Bale (born 1974) (naturalised American citizen)
 Jamie Bamber (born 1973) (dual British and American citizen)
 Yasmin Bannerman (born 1970)
 Nicole Barber-Lane (born 1972)
 Sacha Baron Cohen (born 1971)
 Helen Baxendale (born 1970)
 Kate Beckinsale (born 1973)
 Max Beesley (born 1971)
 Elizabeth Berrington (born 1970)
 Matt Berry (born 1974)
 Eve Best (born 1971)
 Paul Bettany (born 1971)
 Orlando Bloom (born 1977)
 Vanessa Branch (born 1973) (dual British and American citizenship)
 Russell Brand (born 1975)
 Ewen Bremner (born 1970)
 Dannielle Brent (born 1979)
 Liz May Brice (born 1975)
 Kellie Bright (born 1976)
 Clare Buckfield (born 1976)
 Julie Buckfield (born 1976)
 Saffron Burrows (born 1972) (naturalised American citizen)
 Georgina Cates (born 1975)
 Noel Clarke (born 1975)
 Olivia Colman (born 1974)
 Shelley Conn (born 1976)
 Paddy Considine (born 1973)
 Dominic Cooper (born 1978)
 James Corden (born 1978)
 Christian Coulson (born 1978)
 Julie Cox (born 1973)
 Richard Coyle (born 1974)
 Mackenzie Crook (born 1971)
 Benedict Cumberbatch (born 1976)
 Hugh Dancy (born 1975)
 Jack Davenport (born 1973)
 Lucy Davis (born 1973)
 Warwick Davis (born 1970)
 Rupert Degas (born 1970)
 Dustin Demri-Burns (born 1978)
 Kate Dickie (born 1971)
 Mikyla Dodd (born 1978)
 Jason Done (born 1973)
 Shaun Dooley (born 1974)
 Minnie Driver (born 1970) (naturalised American citizen)
 Anne-Marie Duff (born 1970)
 Sharon Duncan-Brewster (born 1976)
 Terri Dwyer (born 1973)
 Danny Dyer (born 1977)
 Jeremy Edwards (born 1971)
 Chiwetel Ejiofor (born 1977)
 Idris Elba (born 1972)
 Tom Ellis (born 1978)
 Luke Evans (born 1979)
 Niki Evans (born 1972)
 JJ Feild (born 1978) (born in Boulder, Colorado, United States) (British-American actor)
 Joseph Fiennes (born 1970)
 Emilia Fox (born 1974)
 Martin Freeman (born 1971)
 Anna Friel (born 1976)
 Nick Frost (born 1972)
 Charlotte Gainsbourg (born 1971)
 Matthew Goode (born 1978)
 Claire Goose (born 1975)
 Sarah Gordy (born 1978)
 Burn Gorman (born 1974) (born in Hollywood, California, United States)
 Stephen Graham (born 1973)
 Rachel Grant (born 1977)
 Eva Gray (born 1970)
 Angela Griffin (born 1976)
 Ioan Gruffudd (born 1973)
 Sienna Guillory (born 1975)
 Suzanne Hall (born 1972)
 Ian Hallard (born 1974)
 Tom Hardy (born 1977)
 Ricci Harnett (born 1973)
 Naomie Harris (born 1976)
 Miranda Hart (born 1972)
 Keeley Hawes (born 1976)
 Sally Hawkins (born 1976)
 Rebecca Hazlewood (born 1977)
 Lena Headey (born 1973) (born in Hamilton, Bermuda)
 Tina Hobley (born 1971)
 Anna Hope (born 1974)
 Jim Howick (born 1975)
 Jessica Hynes (born 1972)
 Jynine James (born 1972)
 Samantha Janus (born 1972)
 Tonicha Jeronimo (born 1977)
 Susy Kane (born 1978)
 Rose Keegan (born 1971)
 Katherine Kelly (born 1979)
 Andrew Lancel (born 1970)
 Jude Law (born 1972)
 Adam Levy (born 1970)
 Damian Lewis (born 1971)
 Andrew Lincoln (born 1973)
 Emily Lloyd (born 1970)
 Jamie Lomas (born 1975)
 Louise Lombard (born 1970)
 Matt Lucas (born 1974)
 Kelly Macdonald (born 1976)
 Matthew Macfadyen (born 1974)
 Anna Maxwell-Martin (born 1977)
 Kris Marshall (born 1973)
 Jodhi May (born 1975)
 James McAvoy (born 1979)
 Ewan McGregor (born 1971)
 Tobias Menzies (born 1974)
 Jonny Lee Miller (born 1972) (naturalised American citizen)
 Wentworth Miller (born 1972) (dual British and American citizenship)
 Jimi Mistry (born 1973)
 Rhona Mitra (born 1976)
 Dominic Monaghan (born 1976)
 Tanya Moodie (born 1972/1973) (born in Canada)
 Hattie Morahan (born 1978)
 Tara Moran (born 1971)
 Emily Mortimer (born 1971) (naturalised American citizen)
 Samantha Morton (born 1977)
 Richard Mylan (born 1973)
 Eve Myles (born 1978)

N–Z

 Parminder Nagra (born 1975)
 Thandiwe Newton (born 1972)
 Kerry Norton (born 1974)
 John Oliver (born 1977)
 DeObia Oparei (born 1971)
 Tamzin Outhwaite (born 1970)
 David Oyelowo (born 1976) (naturalised American citizen)
 Joanna Page (born 1977)
 Patsy Palmer (born 1972)
 Archie Panjabi (born 1972)
 Ray Park (born 1974)
 Martin Parr (born 1970)
 Simon Pegg (born 1970)
 Rupert Penry-Jones (born 1970)
 Alistair Petrie (born 1970)
 Sally Phillips (born 1970)
 Nick Pickard (born 1975)
 Rosamund Pike (born 1979)
 Lucy Punch (born 1977)
 James Redmond (born 1971)
 Matthew Rhys (born 1974)
 Golda Rosheuvel (born 1970) (born in Guyana)
 Laila Rouass (born 1971)
 Andrew Scarborough (born 1973)
 Peter Serafinowicz (born 1972)
 John Simm (born 1970)
 Dan Renton Skinner (born 1973)
 Harvey Spencer Stephens (born 1970)
 Jim Sturgess (born 1978)
 Claire Sweeney (born 1971)
 Davinia Taylor (born 1977)
 Joanna Taylor (born 1978)
 Kerrie Taylor (born 1973)
 David Tennant (born 1971)
 Marsha Thomason (born 1976)
 Indira Varma (born 1973) (dual British and Swiss citizenship)
 Johnny Vegas (born 1970)
 Hannah Waddingham (born 1974)
 Sonya Walger (born 1974) (naturalised American citizen)
 Nicola Walker (born 1970)
 David Walliams (born 1971)
 Rachel Weisz (born 1970) (naturalised American citizen)
 Joe Wilkinson (born 1975)
 Finty Williams (born 1972)
 Beth Winslet (born 1978)
 Kate Winslet (born 1975)
 Duncan Wisbey (born 1971)
 Benedict Wong (born 1971)
 Rik Young (born 1978)

Born in the 1980s

A–H

 Zahra Ahmadi (born 1982)
 Riz Ahmed (born 1982)
 Laura Aikman (born 1985)
 Edward Akrout (born 1982)
 Jodi Albert (born 1983)
 Ben Aldridge (born 1985)
 Alfie Allen (born 1986)
 Aml Ameen (born 1985)
 Susie Amy (born 1981)
 Jonas Armstrong (born 1981) (born in Dublin, Ireland)
 Clare-Hope Ashitey (born 1987)
 Zawe Ashton (born 1984)
 Gemma Arterton (born 1986)
 Emily Atack (born 1989)
 Aimie Atkinson (born 1987)
 Gemma Atkinson (born 1984)
 Hayley Atwell (born 1982) (dual British and American citizenship)
 Afshan Azad (born 1988)
 Jonathan Bailey (born 1988)
 Matt Barber (born 1983)
 Aneurin Barnard (born 1987)
 Ben Barnes (born 1981)
 Mischa Barton (born 1986) (naturalised American citizen)
 Ali Bastian (born 1982)
 Ben Batt (born 1986)
 Mathew Baynton (born 1980)
 Emily Beecham (born 1984) (dual British and American citizenship)
 Jamie Bell (born 1986)
 Kingsley Ben-Adir (born 1986)
 Pippa Bennett-Warner (born 1988)
 Emily Berrington (born 1986)
 Lydia Rose Bewley (born 1985)
 Jennifer Biddall (born 1980)
 Sean Biggerstaff (born 1983)
 Gemma Bissix (born 1983)
 Emily Blunt (born 1983) (naturalised American citizen)
 Cressida Bonas (born 1989)
 Zoe Boyle (born 1989)
 Jamie Campbell Bower (born 1988)
 Hollie-Jay Bowes (born 1989)
 Josh Bowman (born 1988)
 Anna Brewster (born 1986)
 Tom Burke (born 1981)
 Guy Burnet (born 1983)
 Ryan Cartwright (born 1981)
 Natalie Casey (born 1980)
 Jessie Cave (born 1987)
 Henry Cavill (born 1983)
 Gemma Chan (born 1982)
 Carla Chases (born 1984)
 Shefali Chowdhury (born 1988)
 Charlotte Church (born 1986)
 Sam Claflin (born 1986)
 Emilia Clarke (born 1986)
 Klariza Clayton (born 1989)
 Sian Clifford (born 1982)
 Michaela Coel (born 1987)
 Joe Cole (born 1988)
 Lily Cole (born 1988)
 Jenna Coleman (born 1986)
 Lily Collins (born 1989) (naturalised American citizen)
 Claire Cooper (born 1980)
 Kari Corbett (born 1984)
 Angel Coulby (born 1980)
 Alice Coulthard (born 1983)
 Charlie Cox (born 1982)
 Lenora Crichlow (born 1985)
 Ben Cura (born 1988) (born in Argentina)
 Arthur Darvill (born 1982)
 Gareth David-Lloyd (born 1981)
 Ashley Taylor Dawson (born 1982)
 Jamie Demetriou (born 1987/1988) (British-Cypriot)
 Joe Dempsie (born 1987)
 Sacha Dhawan (born 1984)
 Sophia Di Martino (born 1983)
 Michelle Dockery (born 1981)
 Natalie Dormer (born 1982)
 Jamie Dornan (born 1982)
 Sarah Jayne Dunn (born 1981)
 Aimee-Ffion Edwards (born 1987)
 Tamsin Egerton (born 1988)
 Taron Egerton (born 1989)
 Nathalie Emmanuel (born 1989)
 Alfred Enoch (born 1988)
 Lucy Evans (born 1985)
 Alice Eve (born 1982) (naturalised American citizen)
 Lloyd Everitt (born 1987)
 Leila Farzad (born 1983)
 Emerald Fennell (born 1985)
 Tom Felton (born 1987)
 Jessica Brown Findlay (born 1989)
 Johnny Flynn (born 1983)
 Jacob Fortune-Lloyd (born 1988)
 Jessica Fox (born 1983)
 Phoebe Fox (born 1987)
 Claire Foy (born 1984)
 Lily Frazer (born 1988)
 Rupert Friend (born 1981)
 Joanne Froggatt (born 1980)
 Elyes Gabel (born 1983)
 Romola Garai (born 1982) (born in Hong Kong)
 Andrew Garfield (born 1983) (dual British and American citizenship; born in Los Angeles, California, United States)
 Chris Geere (born 1981)
 Samia Ghadie (born 1982)
 Mandip Gill (born 1988)
 Karen Gillan (born 1987)
 Henry Golding (born 1987) (born in Betong, Malaysia)
 Holliday Grainger (born 1988)
 Kelly Greenwood (born 1982)
 Lucy Griffiths (born 1986)
 Rupert Grint (born 1988)
 Kevin Guthrie (born 1988)
 David Gyasi (born 1980)
 Leah Hackett (born 1985)
 Rebecca Hall (born 1982) (dual British and American citizenship)
 Rosalind Halstead (born 1984)
 Rasmus Hardiker (born 1985)
 Kit Harington (born 1986)
 Lauren Harris (born 1984)
 Toby Hemingway (born 1983)
 Sam Heughan (born 1980)
 Mitch Hewer (born 1989)
 Tom Hiddleston (born 1981)
 Edward Holcroft (born 1987)
 Cara Horgan (born 1984)
 Nicholas Hoult (born 1989)
 Kirby Howell-Baptiste (born 1987)
 Charlie Hunnam (born 1980)

I–Q

 Tracy Ifeachor (born 1985) (Nigerian-British)
 Daniel Ings (born 1985)
 Max Irons (born 1985)
 Bradley James (born 1983)
 Lily James (born 1989)
 Theo James (born 1984)
 Jameela Jamil (born 1986)
 Ciara Janson (born 1987)
 Kimberly Jaraj (born 1986)
 Claudia Jessie (born 1989)
 Felicity Jones (born 1983)
 Cush Jumbo (born 1985)
 Daniel Kaluuya (born 1989)
 Amara Karan (born 1984)
 Gerard Kearns (born 1984)
 Toby Kebbell (born 1982)
 Michelle Keegan (born 1987)
 Laura Michelle Kelly (born 1981)
 Emer Kenny (born 1989)
 Maria Keogh (born 1982)
 Sair Khan (born 1988)
 Ferdinand Kingsley (born 1988)
 Brooke Kinsella (born 1983)
 Malachi Kirby (born 1989)
 Jemima Kirke (born 1985) (dual British and American citizenship)
 Keira Knightley (born 1985)
 Gwilym Lee (born 1983)
 Rose Leslie (born 1987)
 Katie Leung (born 1987)
 Matthew Lewis (born 1989)
 Sarah Linda (born 1987)
 Zoë Lister (born 1982)
 Harry Lloyd (born 1983)
 Henry Lloyd-Hughes (born 1985)
 Thomas James Longley (born 1989)
 Ophelia Lovibond (born 1986)
 Gary Lucy (born 1981)
 Jing Lusi (born in 1985) (born in Pudong, Shanghai, China)
 Lashana Lynch (born 1987)
 Kate Maberly (born 1982)
 Pearl Mackie (born 1987)
 Richard Madden (born 1986)
 Ruth Madeley (born 1987)
 Gugu Mbatha-Raw (born 1983)
 Matt McCooey (born 1981)
 Matthew McNulty (born 1982)
 Harry Melling (born 1989)
 Tamzin Merchant (born 1987)
 Tuppence Middleton (born 1987)
 Sienna Miller (born 1981) (born in New York City; dual British and American citizenship)
 Tom Mison (born 1982)
 Sonoya Mizuno (born 1986) (born in Tokyo, Japan)
 Zackary Momoh (born 1988)
 Janet Montgomery (born 1985)
 Colin Morgan (born 1986)
 Joseph Morgan (born 1981)
 William Moseley (born 1987)
 Sinéad Moynihan (born 1982)
 Ashley Mulheron (born 1983)
 Tiffany Mulheron (born 1984)
 Carey Mulligan (born 1985)
 Hannah Murray (born 1989)
 Sophia Myles (born 1980)
 Adam Nagaitis (born 1985)
 Kunal Nayyar (born 1981)
 Hannah New (born 1984)
 Mary Nighy (born 1984)
 Michael Obiora (born 1986)
 Natasha O'Keeffe (born 1986)
 Regé-Jean Page (born 1988)
 Luke Pasqualino (born 1989)
 Robert Pattinson (born 1986)
 April Pearson (born 1989)
 James Phelps (born 1986)
 Oliver Phelps (born 1986)
 Royce Pierreson (born 1989)
 Billie Piper (born 1982)
 Chloe Pirrie (born 1987)
 Imogen Poots (born 1989)
 Anna Popplewell (born 1988)
 Jorgie Porter (born 1987)
 Cassie Powney (born 1983)
 Connie Powney (born 1983)

R–Z

 Daniel Radcliffe (born 1989)
 George Rainsford (born 1982)
 Richard Rankin (born 1983)
 Eddie Redmayne (born 1982)
 Iwan Rheon (born 1985)
 Emma Rigby (born 1989)
 Charlotte Riley (born 1981)
 Talulah Riley (born 1985)
 Alexandra Roach (born 1987)
 James Roache (born 1985)
 Iain Robertson (born 1981)
 Sharon Rooney (born 1988)
 Jemima Rooper (born 1981)
 Samantha Rowley (born 1988)
 Sophie Rundle (born 1988)
 Verity Rushworth (born 1985)
 Matt Ryan (born 1981)
 Michelle Ryan (born 1984)
 Amit Shah (born 1981)
 Daniel Sharman (born 1986)
 Judi Shekoni (born 1982)
 Hugh Skinner (born 1985)
 Adele Silva (born 1980)
 Ashley Slanina-Davies (born 1989)
 Matt Smith (born 1982)
 Rafe Spall (born 1983)
 Flora Spencer-Longhurst (born 1985)
 Clive Standen (born 1981)
 Carley Stenson (born 1982)
 Dan Stevens (born 1982)
 Catrin Stewart (born 1988)
 Lucy St. Louis (born 1986/1987)
 Benjamin Stone (born 1987)
 Tom Stourton (born 1987)
 Scarlett Strallen (born 1982)
 Summer Strallen (born 1985)
 Tom Sturridge (born 1985)
 James Sutton (born 1983)
 Juno Temple (born 1989)
 Natalia Tena (born 1984)
 Georgia Tennant (born 1984)
 Rakhee Thakrar (born 1984)
 Phoebe Thomas (born 1983)
 Luke Thompson (born 1988)
 Gabriel Thomson (born 1986)
 Elliott Tittensor (born 1989)
 Luke Tittensor (born 1989)
 Hannah Tointon (born 1987)
 Kara Tointon (born 1983)
 Elize du Toit (born 1981) (born in Grahamstown, South Africa)
 Russell Tovey (born 1981)
 Harry Treadaway (born 1984)
 Luke Treadaway (born 1984)
 Jodie Turner-Smith (born 1986 or 1988)
 Charity Wakefield (born 1980)
 Phoebe Waller-Bridge (born 1985)
 Annabelle Wallis (born 1984)
 Anna Walton (born 1980)
 Hannah Ware (born 1982)
 Al Weaver (born 1981)
 Charley Webb (born 1988)
 Ed Weeks (born 1980)
 Anthony Welsh (born 1983)
 Ed Westwick (born 1987)
 Gemma Whelan (born 1981)
 Ben Whishaw (born 1980)
 Jack Whitehall (born 1988)
 Jodie Whittaker (born 1982)
 Ricky Whittle (born 1981)
 Larissa Wilson (born 1989)
 Ruth Wilson (born 1983)
 Sophie Winkleman (born 1980)
 Jaime Winstone (born 1985)
 Gabriella Wright (born 1982) (naturalised French citizen)
 Luke Youngblood (born 1986)

Born in the 1990s

A–M

 Marisa Abela (born 1996)
 Samuel Adewunmi (born 1994)
 Eubha Akilade (born 1998)
 Patricia Allison (born 1994)
 Jessica Alexander (born 1999)
 Olly Alexander (born 1990)
 Joe Alwyn (born 1991)
 Amber Anderson (born 1992)
 Emma Appleton (born 1991)
 Simone Ashley (born 1995)
 Joivan Wade (born 1993)
 Percelle Ascott (born 1993) (born in Zimbabwe)
 Ella Balinska (born 1996)
 Ellie Bamber (born 1997)
 Manpreet Bambra (born 1992)
 Lucy May Barker (born 1992)
 Ruby Barker (born 1996)
 Samantha Barks (born 1990)
 Helena Barlow (born 1998)
 Sabrina Bartlett (born 1991)
 Joey Batey (born 1991)
 Charlotte Beaumont (born 1995)
 Julia Brown (born 1997)
 Tom Blyth (born 1995)
 Alana Boden (born 1997)
 Charithra Chandran (born 1997)
 Eliza Bennett (born 1992)
 Alia Bhatt (born 1993)
 Edward Bluemel (born 1993)
 Douglas Booth (born 1992)
 Jamie Borthwick (born 1994)
 John Boyega (born 1992)
 Lucy Boynton (born 1994) (born in the United States; dual British and American citizenship)
 Thomas Brodie-Sangster (born 1990)
 Gabrielle Brooks (born 1990)
 Simona Brown (born 1994)
 Shalom Brune-Franklin (born 1994) (British-Australian)
 Céline Buckens (born 1996) (born in Belgium)
 Asa Butterfield (born 1997)
 Harriet Cains (born 1993)
 Bessie Carter (born 1993)
 Freddy Carter (born 1993)
 Anya Chalotra (born 1996)
 Dean-Charles Chapman (born 1997)
 Antonia Clarke (born 1995)
 Morfydd Clark (born 1990) (born in Sweden)
 Sophie Kennedy Clark (born 1990)
 Tosin Cole (born 1992)
 Hugh Coles (born 1992)
 Jodie Comer (born 1993)
 Olivia Cooke (born 1993)
 Sophie Cookson (born 1990)
 Hermione Corfield (born 1993)
 Emma Corrin (born 1995)
 Ellie Darcey-Alden (born 1999)
 Alexa Davies (born 1995)
 Fern Deacon (born 1998)
 Cara Delevingne (born 1992)
 Sebastian de Souza (born 1993)
 Hannah Dodd (born 1995)
 Thomas Doherty (born 1995)
 Omari Douglas (born 1994)
 Poppy Drayton (born 1991)
 Tyger Drew-Honey (born 1996)
 Lucinda Dryzek (born 1991)
 Madeline Duggan (born 1994)
 Phoebe Dynevor (born 1995)
 Daisy Edgar-Jones (born 1998)
 Fady Elsayed (born 1993)
 Otto Farrant (born 1996)
 Hero Fiennes-Tiffin (born 1997)
 Nell Tiger Free (born 1999)
 Poppy Lee Friar (born 1995)
 Ncuti Gatwa (born 1992) (born in Kigali, Rwanda)
 Poppy Gilbert (born 1996) (born in Stockholm, Sweden)
 Mia Goth (born 1993)
 Theo Graham (born 1997)
 Sorcha Groundsell (born 1998)
 Ben Hardy (born 1991)
 Jonah Hauer-King (born 1995)
 Daisy Head (born 1991)
 Charlie Heaton (born 1994)
 Isaac Hempstead Wright (born 1999)
 Georgie Henley (born 1995)
 Jessica Henwick (born 1992)
 Amy-Leigh Hickman (born 1997)
 Freddie Highmore (born 1992)
 Tom Holland (born 1996)
 Ellis Hollins (born 1999)
 Callum Scott Howells (born 1999)
 Izuka Hoyle (born 1996)
 Nell Hudson (born 1990)
 Ella Hunt (born 1998)
 Rachel Hurd-Wood (born 1990)
 Damson Idris (born 1991)
 Martins Imhangbe (born 1991) (British-Nigerian)
 Angus Imrie (born 1994)
 Kerry Ingram (born 1999)
 Jeremy Irvine (born 1990)
 Dominique Jackson (born 1991)
 Amy James-Kelly (born 1995)
 Jacqueline Jossa (born 1992)
 Viveik Kalra (born 1994 or 1998)
 Synnøve Karlsen (born 1996)
 Brad Kavanagh (born 1992)
 Robbie Kay (born 1995)
 Mimi Keene (born 1998)
 Tilly Keeper (born 1997)
 Erin Kellyman (born 1998)
 Ellie Kendrick (born 1990)
 Skandar Keynes (born 1991)
 Tommy Knight (born 1993)
 Emma Laird (born 1998)
 Lucien Laviscount (born 1992)
 Thomas Law (born 1992)
 Alex Lawther (born 1995)
 Jessie Mei Li (born 1995)
 Ricardo P. Lloyd (born 1993)
 Georgia Lock (born 1996)
 Bobby Lockwood (born 1993)
 Jessica Lord (born 1998)
 Lily Loveless (born 1990)
 George Mackay (born 1992)
 Emma Mackey (born 1996) (born in Le Mans, France)
 Jessica Madsen (born 1992)
 Madeleine Mantock (born 1990)
 Noah Marullo (born 1999)
 Freya Mavor (born 1993)
 Lauren McCrostie (born 1996)
 Mia McKenna-Bruce (born 1997)
 Lauren McQueen (born 1996)
 Danny Miller (born 1991)
 Nico Mirallegro (born 1991)
 Ambika Mod (born 1995/1996)
 Olivia Morris (born 1997)
 Ana Mulvoy-Ten (born 1992)

N–Z

 Rukku Nahar (born 1996)
 Mimi Ndiweni (born 1991) (British-Zimbabwean)
 Luke Newton (born 1993)
 James G. Nunn (born 1993)
 Agnes O'Casey (born 1995/1996)
 Jack O'Connell (born 1990)
 Josh O'Connor (born 1990)
 Harrison Osterfield (born 1996)
 Dev Patel (born 1990)
 Himesh Patel (born 1990)
 Alex Pettyfer (born 1990)
 Will Poulter (born 1993)
 Bel Powley (born 1992)
 Kathryn Prescott (born 1991)
 Megan Prescott (born 1991)
 Dominique Provost-Chalkley (born 1990)
 Florence Pugh (born 1996)
 Ella Purnell (born 1996)
 Joseph Quinn (born 1993 or 1994)
 Emily Reid (born 1998)
 Archie Renaux (born 1997)
 Jordan Renzo (born 1993) (British-American)
 Sam Retford (born 1999) (born in Australia)
 Tanya Reynolds (born 1991)
 Dakota Blue Richards (born 1994)
 Maisie Richardson-Sellers (born 1992)
 Daisy Ridley (born 1992)
 Craig Roberts (born 1991)
 Jack Rowan (born 1997)
 Charlie Rowe (born 1996)
 Lily Sacofsky (born 1994)
 Eliot Salt (born 1994)
 Banita Sandhu (born 1997)
 Rory J. Saper (born 1996)
 Alex Sawyer (born 1993)
 Kaya Scodelario (born 1992)
 Naomi Scott (born 1993)
 Anna Shaffer (born 1992)
 Dominic Sherwood (born 1990)
 Sophie Simnett (born 1997)
 Sophie Skelton (born 1994)
 Eugene Simon (born 1992)
 Joshua Sinclair-Evans (born 1995)
 Ella-Rae Smith (born 1998)
 Ceallach Spellman (born 1995)
 Charlotte Spencer (born 1991)
 Sam Strike (born 1994)
 Sophie Stuckey (born 1991)
 Harry Styles (born 1994)
 Jessica Sula (born 1994)
 Gregg Sulkin (born 1992) (naturalised American citizen)
 Connor Swindells (born 1996)
 Eden Taylor-Draper (born 1997)
 Aaron Taylor-Johnson (born 1990)
 Anya Taylor-Joy (born 1996) (born in Miami, Florida; British-Argentine)
 Sean Teale (born 1992)
 Thalissa Teixeira (born 1992/1993)
 Abigail Thorn (born 1993)
 Freddie Thorp (born 1994)
 Eleanor Tomlinson (born 1992)
 Lily Travers (born 1990)
 Callum Turner (born 1990)
 Sophie Turner (born 1996)
 Sam Tutty (born 1998)
 Joanna Vanderham (born 1990)
 Hannah van der Westhuysen (born 1995)
 Jordan Waller (born 1992)
 Suki Waterhouse (born 1992)
 Emma Watson (born 1990) (born in Paris, France)
 Lydia West (born 1993)
 Fionn Whitehead (born 1997)
 Maisie Williams (born 1997)
 Rose Williams (born 1994)
 Kedar Williams-Stirling (born 1994)
 Aimee Lou Wood (born 1994)
 Carla Woodcock (born 1998)
 Bethan Wright (born 1996)
 Bonnie Wright (born 1991)
 Letitia Wright (born 1993) (born in Georgetown, Guyana)
 Kit Young (born 1994)

Born in the 2000s 

 Freya Allan (born 2001)
 Isabelle Allen (born 2002)
 Jade Alleyne (born 2001)
 Alex Bain (born 2001)
 Bukky Bakray (born 2002)
 Ruby Barnhill (born 2004)
 Rosie Bentham (born 2001)
 Harley Bird (born 2001)
 Caitlin Blackwood (born 2000)
 Isabella Blake-Thomas (born 2002)
 Millie Bobby Brown (born 2004) (born in Spain)
 Emily Carey (born 2003)
 Raffey Cassidy (born 2001)
 Earl Cave (born 2000)
 Kit Connor (born 2004)
 Sebastian Croft (born 2001)
 Cleo Demetriou (born 2001)
 Lino Facioli (born 2000)
 Georgie Farmer (born 2001)
 Yasmin Finney (born 2003)
 William Gao (born 2003)
 Harry Gilby (born 2001)
 Ella Greenwood (born 2001)
 Chloe Hawthorn (born 2002)
 Jack Hollington (born 2001)
 Lucy Hutchinson (born 2003)
 Louis Hynes (born 2001)
 Millie Innes (born 2000)
 Emilia Jones (born 2002)
 Samuel Joslin (born 2002)
 Mia Jenkins (born 2000)
 Noah Jupe (born 2005)
 Alexander James Rodriguez (born 2007) (born in Spain)
 Dafne Keen (born 2005) (born in Spain)
 Sophia Kiely (born 2000)
 Honor Kneafsey (born 2004)
 Lily Laight (born 2001)
 Iris Law (born 2000)
 Ellie Leach (born 2001)
 Lewis MacDougall (born 2002)
 Ramona Marquez (born 2001)
 Bailey May (born 2002)
 Isobelle Molloy (born 2000)
 Elle Mulvaney (born 2002)
 Mya-Lecia Naylor (2002–2019)
 Brenock O'Connor (born 2000)
 Ruby O'Donnell (born 2000)
 Isabella Pappas (born 2002) (born in Italy)
 Milo Parker (born 2002)
 Nico Parker (born 2004)
 Louis Partridge (born 2003)
 Kia Pegg (born 2000)
 Tilly Ramsay (born 2001)
 Bella Ramsey (born 2003)
 Darci Shaw (born 2002)
 Mimi Slinger (born 2003)
 Tamara Smart (born 2005)
 Maisie Smith (born 2001)
 Isobel Steele (born 2000)
 Ruby Stokes (born 2000)
 Tom Taylor (born 2001)
 Amir Wilson (born 2004)
 Lara Wollington (born 2003)
 Eleanor Worthington Cox (born 2001)

Born in the 2010s
 Indica Watson (born 2010)

Unknown birthdate

 Vivienne Acheampong
 Robert Boulter
 Lu Corfield
 Brian Cowan
 Nathalie Cox
 Gabrielle Creevy
 Bart Edwards
 Ray Fearon
 Daniel Francis
 Kevin Howarth
 Emma Laird
 Jo Martin
 Leonora Moore
 Helen Noble
 Travis Oliver
 Rob Ostlere
 Jenny Rainsford
 Georgina Redhead
 Charlotte Ritchie
 Katharine Schlesinger
 Karla-Simone Spence
 Simon Templeman 
 Michael Thomson
 Imogen Toner
 Micheal Ward 
 Eve White
 Toby Williams

See also

 Cinema of the United Kingdom
 Lists of actors
 Lists of British people
 Radio in the United Kingdom
 Television in the United Kingdom
 Theatre of the United Kingdom
 List of British Academy Award nominees and winners
 List of Irish actors

References

British
Actors